is a Japanese football player, who plays for Kagoshima United FC.

Career
After his outstanding performance in the Prince Takamado Cup with Vissel Kobe's youth team, Yonezawa signed a pro contract with Cerezo Osaka. He was loaned to J3 Blaublitz Akita until the end of 2015.In 2019, he signed to Kagoshima United.

Club statistics
.

References

External links
Profile at Renofa Yamaguchi
Profile at Cerezo Osaka

1996 births
Living people
Association football people from Osaka Prefecture
People from Sakai, Osaka
Japanese footballers
J2 League players
J3 League players
Cerezo Osaka players
Cerezo Osaka U-23 players
Blaublitz Akita players
Renofa Yamaguchi FC players
Kagoshima United FC players
Association football forwards